This page lists the winners and nominees for the Soul Train Music Award for Best Album of the Year. Originally entitled Best R&B/Soul or Rap Album of the Year, it was first awarded during the 1997 ceremony. It was renamed to its current title during the 2004 ceremony. During the years 2005 to 2008, the category was separated to award female, male and group albums separate awards.

Beyoncé is the biggest winner with four wins.

Winners and nominees
Winners are listed first and highlighted in bold.

1990s

2000s

2010s

2020s

See also
 Soul Train Music Award for Best R&B/Soul Album – Male
 Soul Train Music Award for Best R&B/Soul Album – Female
 Soul Train Music Award for Best R&B/Soul Album – Group, Band or Duo

References

Soul Train Music Awards
Album awards